Peter Paul Kreuder (18 August 1905 – 28 June 1981) was a German-Austrian pianist, composer and conductor.

Life

Kreuder was born in Aachen, the son of a Kammersänger. He enrolled as a piano student at the Cologne Conservatory in 1910, where he performed his first concert one year later, and at music academies in Munich, Berlin and Hamburg. After World War I he worked as a composer of musical performances at  the Hamburg Kammerspiele theatre, at the Munich Staatstheater am Gärtnerplatz, as well as of several Kabarett and revue productions. In the meantime he continued his studies, taking his exams at the Munich Academy of Music in 1924.

In 1925 he was employed as Kapellmeister at the Deutsches Theater München, and conducted theatre ensembles, first in Munich and then in Berlin, where he worked with Max Reinhardt. In 1930 he met with Friedrich Hollaender, whom he assisted arranging the musical score of Josef von Sternberg's film The Blue Angel starring Marlene Dietrich. During the 1930s and 40s he became one of the most sought-after German musical film composers; his credits run to some 150 movies. Several songs, performed by stars like Zarah Leander or Marika Rökk, are popular and covered up to today.

Kreuder joined the Nazi Party in 1932, however, he resigned his membership in 1934.  His compositions added to the intended development of a "German" light music genre as contrasted to the US big band style, though they contained a large deal of jazz and swing elements. He emigrated to Sweden in 1939, but returned to Germany two years later after threats against his relatives were launched by the Nazi authorities.

After World War II Kreuder adopted Austrian citizenship and conducted radio orchestras in Brazil and Argentina. In the second half of the 1950s, he was sometimes the pianist of Joséphine Baker. He died in Salzburg and is buried in Munich Ostfriedhof, grave number 55-19-2.

In addition to his film work, Kreuder also wrote popular songs and art pieces, including a piano concerto, operettas, musicals, and two operas, Der Zerissene (1940) and Der Postmeister (1966). He wrote two memoirs, Schön war die Zeit (1955) and Nur Puppen haben keine Tränen (1971).

Filmography

 Peter Voss, Thief of Millions (1932)
 A Woman Like You (1933)
 Mazurka (1935)
 White Slaves (1936)
 Tomfoolery (1936)
 Court Theatre (1936)
 A Wedding Dream (1936)
 Capers (1937)
 Gasparone (1937)
 Woman's Love—Woman's Suffering (1937)
 Serenade (1937)
 The Muzzle (1938)
 Water for Canitoga (1939)
 Opera Ball (1939)
 Hello Janine! (1939)
 Nanette (1940)
 The Three Codonas (1940)
 The Singing House (1948)
 The Honourable Tenant (1951)
 I Can't Marry Them All (1952)
 Arlette Conquers Paris (1953)
 A Musical War of Love (1953)
 Hit Parade (1953)
 The Mosquito (1954)
 The First Kiss (1954)
 Her First Date (1955)
 Stolen Heaven (1974)

References

"Peter Kreuder". Oxford Music Online, accessed 30 July 2012. oxfordmusiconline.com

External links

 

German pianists
German male conductors (music)
German film score composers
Male film score composers
German male composers
People from Aachen
1905 births
1981 deaths
Burials at the Ostfriedhof (Munich)
20th-century German conductors (music)
20th-century pianists
20th-century German composers
German male pianists
20th-century German male musicians